Abraham Zevi Idelsohn ( Avrohom Tzvi Idelsohn in Ashkenazi Hebrew; middle name also rendered Tzvi, Zvi, Zwi, or Zebi; June 11, 1882 – August 14, 1938) was a prominent Jewish ethnomusicologist and composer, who conducted several comprehensive studies of Jewish music around the world.

Idelsohn was born in Feliksberg, Latvia, then part of Russian Empire and trained as a cantor. He worked briefly in both Europe and South Africa before emigrating to Palestine in 1905 and establishing a school of Jewish music there in 1919. In 1922 he moved to Cincinnati, Ohio to take a position as professor of Jewish music at Hebrew Union College. He died in Johannesburg, South Africa, where he also supported the establishment of South African Progressive Judaism. He is also famous for being the first researcher to document the folk music of Syrian Jews.

Idelsohn is generally acknowledged as the “father” of modern Jewish musicology, despite his publishing starting after that of Angie Irma Cohon. During his time in Jerusalem, he noted a great diversity of musical traditions among the Jews living in the region.  Idelsohn examined these traditional melodies and found recurring motifs and progressions that were not found in any other national music. This suggested a common origin for musical phrases that went back to Israel/Palestine in the first century C.E. He found that these motifs fell into three distinct tonal centers, which corresponded to the Dorian, Phrygian, and Lydian modes of the ancient Greeks. Each of these modes elicited a distinct psycho-emotional response. The Dorian Mode was used for texts of an elevated and inspired nature; the Phrygian for sentimental texts, with their very human outbreaks of feeling, both of joy and grief; and the Lydian was used in composing music for the texts of lamenting and confessions of sins. Idelsohn further categorized and defined these motives as ones that either prepared a musical phrase, began it, or concluded it.

His works include the monumental Thesaurus of Hebrew Oriental Melodies (10 volumes, 1914–1932), Jewish Music (1929), and a collaboration with Cohon on Harvest Festivals, A Children’s Succoth Celebration. He was also the music teacher to Moshe Nathanson, a well-known Jewish composer who is known to be the author of the lyrics to the famous Jewish folk song "Hava Nagila."

He is the maternal grandfather of Joel Goodman Joffe (Baron Joffe).

Notes and references 

 
 Works by and about Abraham Zevi Idelsohn in University Library JCS Frankfurt am Main: Digital Collections Judaica
 Idelsohn at the Encyclopædia Britannica
 On-line access to Thesaurus of Hebrew Oriental Melodies: English edition, omitting vols 3–5
 Hebrew edition, vols 1–5 only

External links
 

1882 births
1938 deaths
People from Ventspils Municipality
People from Courland Governorate
Latvian Jews
Jews from the Russian Empire
Emigrants from the Russian Empire to the Ottoman Empire
Ashkenazi Jews in Mandatory Palestine
American people of Latvian-Jewish descent
Latvian musicologists
Hazzans
Jewish folklorists
20th-century Russian male singers
20th-century Russian singers
20th-century musicologists
Jewish musicologists
Hebrew Union College – Jewish Institute of Religion faculty